Philorhizus vectensis is a species of brown coloured ground beetle in the Lebiinae subfamily that can be found in British Isles, France, Portugal, and Spain.

Description habitat
Its elytron have a transverse band that is dark in colour while the shoulders and sides are rounded. The abdomen' underside is black or dark brown while the pronotum is bright red coloured. Its striae is distinct and comes with punctures. The wings are absent. It can be found in vegetated dry sand or shingle.

References

Beetles described in 1873
Beetles of Europe